Abhishek Bachchan (born 5 February 1976) is an Indian actor and film producer known for his work in Bollywood. He made his acting debut in 2000 with J. P. Dutta's war film Refugee, and followed it by starring in over a dozen films which were both critical and commercial failures. His first commercial success came with the 2004 action film Dhoom, which changed his career prospects. Bachchan went on to earn critical appreciation for his performances in the dramas Yuva (2004), Sarkar (2005), and Kabhi Alvida Naa Kehna (2006), which won him three consecutive Filmfare Award for Best Supporting Actor. In 2007, he portrayed a character loosely based on Dhirubhai Ambani in Mani Ratnam's drama film Guru, which earned him a nomination for the Filmfare Award for Best Actor.

Bachchan has also played leading and supporting roles in several commercially successful comedies, including Bunty Aur Babli (2005), Bluffmaster! (2005), Dostana (2008), Bol Bachchan (2012), Happy New Year (2014), and Housefull 3 (2016). His highest-grossing releases include the action sequels Dhoom 2 (2006) and Dhoom 3 (2013).

In addition to his three Filmfare Awards, Bachchan has won a National Film Award for Best Feature Film in Hindi for producing the comedy-drama Paa (2009).

Anandalok Puraskar Awards
The Anandalok Puraskar Awards were presented by the ABP Group for outstanding achievement in Bengali cinema, ceremony is one of the most prominent film events for Bengali Cinema in India.

BIG Star Entertainment Awards 
The BIG Star Entertainment Awards is an annual event organised by the Reliance Broadcast Network.

Bollywood Movie Awards 
The Bollywood Movie Awards were presented annually by The Bollywood Group beginning in 1999. They were discontinued after 2007.

Filmfare Awards 
Established in 1954, the Filmfare Awards are presented annually by The Times Group to members of the Hindi film industry.

Filmfare OTT Awards

International Indian Film Academy Awards 
The International Indian Film Academy Awards (shortened as IIFA) is an annual international event organised by the Wizcraft International Entertainment Pvt. Ltd. to honour excellence in the Hindi cinema.

National Film Awards 
The National Film Awards are awarded by the Government of India's Directorate of Film Festivals division for achievements in the Indian film industry.

Producers Guild Film Awards 
The Producers Guild Film Awards (previously knows as Apsara Film & Television Producers Guild Awards) is an annual event originated by the Film Producers Guild of India to recognize excellence in Indian film and television.

Screen Awards 
The Screen Awards are presented annually by Indian Express Limited to honour excellence in Hindi and Marathi cinema.

Stardust Awards 
The Stardust Awards are an annual event organised by Magna Publishing Company Limited.

Zee Cine Awards 
The Zee Cine Awards is an annual award ceremony organised by the Zee Entertainment Enterprises.

Other Awards, Honors and Recognitions

See also 
 Abhishek Bachchan filmography
 List of accolades received by Guru

Notes

References

External links 
 List of awards and nominations received by Abhishek Bachchan at the Internet Movie Database

Lists of awards received by Indian actor